Christof Innerhofer (born 17 December 1984) is an Italian World Cup alpine ski racer, the 2011 world champion in super-G.  in all five alpine disciplines and specializes in the speed events of downhill

Biography
Born in Bruneck, Innerhofer lives in Gais, South Tyrol. He made his World Cup debut at age 21 in November 2006, and won his first race in December 2008, a downhill 

At the 2011 World Championships in Garmisch-Partenkirchen, Germany, Innerhofer won a medal of each color: gold in super-G, silver in super combined, and bronze in downhill. At the first World Cup race following the World Championships, Innerhofer won the super combined at Bansko, Bulgaria. The race was unusual in that the slalom portion was run first, in anticipation of fog; the afternoon speed run was a super-G, rather than a downhill.

World Cup results

Season standings

Race podiums

6 wins – (4 DH, 1 SG, 1 AC)
18 podiums – (9 DH, 7 SG, 2 AC); 83 top tens

World Championship results

Olympic results

See also
 Italians most on the podium in the World Cup
 Italians most successful race winner in the World Cup
 Italy at the FIS Alpine World Ski Championships

References

External links
 
 
 
 
 
  

1984 births
Living people
Italian male alpine skiers
Alpine skiers at the 2010 Winter Olympics
Alpine skiers at the 2014 Winter Olympics
Alpine skiers at the 2018 Winter Olympics
Alpine skiers at the 2022 Winter Olympics
Olympic alpine skiers of Italy
Medalists at the 2014 Winter Olympics
Olympic medalists in alpine skiing
Olympic silver medalists for Italy
Olympic bronze medalists for Italy
Alpine skiers of Fiamme Gialle
Germanophone Italian people
Sportspeople from Bruneck